Agdistis flavissima is a moth in the family Pterophoridae. It is known to occur in China (Xinjang), Turkmenistan, Tajikistan, Uzbekistan, Kazakhstan and European Russia.

Appearance and behaviour
Agdistis flavissima often occurs in the same locations as Agdistis ingens, which it resembles in outward appearance but not genitals. It is a large plume moth.

References

Agdistinae
Moths described in 1920